Alain Rochat (born 1 February 1983) is a retired footballer who played as a defender. Born in Canada, he represented Switzerland internationally.

Club career

Switzerland
Rochat was born in Canada but his family moved to Switzerland when he was two years old. He began his career at Yverdon Sport FC in 1999 before moving to BSC Young Boys in 2002. His play with Young Boys led to a move to French side Rennes in 2005.

Seeing limited action with the French side, Rochat returned to Switzerland joining top side Zürich in time for the 2006 campaign. Rochat was part of the FC Zürich side that won Swiss Super League championship titles during the 2006–07 and 2008–09 campaigns. Having become a prominent member of FC Zurich, he signed a new four-year contract with the club. In 2010, Rochat and FC Zürich reached the group stage of the UEFA Champions League, where they faced Spanish giants Real Madrid, Italian powerhouse AC Milan, and France's Olympique de Marseille in Group C.

Vancouver Whitecaps
He signed with USSF-D2 Vancouver Whitecaps FC during the 2010 season but was immediately loaned back to FC Zürich until 21 January 2011. He joined the Vancouver Whitecaps FC of Major League Soccer upon his return. During the 2011 Major League Soccer season, the Whitecaps finished last MLS, but during the 2012 season, Rochat switched from his usual left back position to a defensive midfield position and helped lead the team to more than 10 clean sheets.

D.C. United
Rochat was traded to D.C. United on 7 June 2013 in exchange for a second-round pick in the 2015 MLS SuperDraft and a conditional pick in the 2016 MLS SuperDraft. Rochat was reportedly unhappy with the trade since it disrupted his family life.

Return to Switzerland

After a month with D.C. United, Rochat was sold to one of his former clubs, BSC Young Boys, for a fee of $500,000.

International career
Rochat appeared for Switzerland at the youth international level before making his senior international debut on 4 June 2005, as Switzerland claimed a 3–1 away victory over the Faroe Islands in Group Four of European qualifying for the 2006 FIFA World Cup in Germany.

Honours

FC Zürich
 Swiss Super League: 2006–07, 2008–09

Notes
A. Signed with Vancouver Whitecaps FC of Major League Soccer and then loaned-back to Zürich until January 2011.

References

External links
 
 
 
 
 

1983 births
Living people
People from Saint-Jean-sur-Richelieu
Swiss men's footballers
Switzerland international footballers
Switzerland under-21 international footballers
Canadian soccer players
Swiss people of Canadian descent
Canadian emigrants to Switzerland
FC Zürich players
BSC Young Boys players
Yverdon-Sport FC players
Association football defenders
Swiss-French people
Soccer people from Quebec
Stade Rennais F.C. players
Swiss expatriate footballers
Swiss Super League players
Ligue 1 players
Major League Soccer players
Vancouver Whitecaps FC players
D.C. United players
Expatriate soccer players in the United States
Swiss expatriate sportspeople in the United States
Expatriate footballers in France
Canadian expatriate sportspeople in France
Swiss expatriate sportspeople in France
Canadian expatriate sportspeople in the United States